The Concho Valley is a region in West Texas. The region takes its name from the Concho River ("shell" in Spanish), named due to its abundance of freshwater mussels in the river.

Counties

Coke
Concho
Crockett
Irion
Kimble
Mason
McCulloch

Menard
Reagan
Schleicher
Sterling
Sutton
Tom Green

Cities

With an estimated population of 97,492 in 2014, San Angelo is the principal city and center of the San Angelo metropolitan area.

Geography
The Concho Valley is located in West Texas in an area from the southwestern reaches of the Edwards Plateau and the northeastern edge of the Chihuahuan desert. The North Concho River and South Concho River merge to form the Concho River in San Angelo.

Identity
Many businesses and organizations use the term "Concho" or "Concho Valley", helping to form a regional identity in the area surrounding the Concho River. Some include the Boy Scouts of America Concho Valley Council, Concho Valley Council of Governments, Concho Valley Electric Cooperative, etc. The oldest is Fort Concho, built in 1867.

See also

 List of geographical regions in Texas
 Edwards Plateau
 West Texas

References

Regions of Texas